Crow Creek is a  creek and minor waterway of southeastern Wyoming and northern Colorado. All the major tributaries of Crow Creek begin in the Laramie Range and flow eastward. The headwaters of the North Fork are dammed to form the North Crow Reservoir which supplies the city of Cheyenne, Wyoming. Middle Fork is also dammed, forming the Granite Reservoir and Crystal Reservoir which also supply Cheyenne. South Fork is the only unobstructed section and flows most of the year, but not all the way to Cheyenne. Other tributaries of Crow Creek below the reservoirs are Sand Creek, Spring Creek and Brush Creek, none of which flow year round. Crow Creek continues in an eastward direction passing through the city of Cheyenne, and then heads east and south into Colorado where it eventually flows into the South Platte River.

See also
List of rivers of Wyoming
List of rivers of Colorado

References

Rivers of Wyoming
Rivers of Colorado
Rivers of Weld County, Colorado
Tributaries of the Platte River